Craving is an American horror film directed by J. Horton and starring Rachel Amanda Bryant, Al Gomez, Gregory Blair, Ashley Undercuffler, Kevin Caliber, Holly Rockwell, Xavier Roe, and Felissa Rose. It was released in March 2023 by Indie Rights.

The film follows heroin addicts who barricade themselves in a country bar after a drug deal goes wrong. As they suffer from withdrawal symptoms and face a siege from outside, they also have to deal with a mysterious threat inside the bar that could destroy them all. Much of the story is told via flashbacks that explain how the various characters arrived at the present standoff.

The film was produced by Kevin Caliber, Ashley Undercuffler, Robert Bravo, and Sean Reid via ZapruderFlix, World One TV, 50 Caliber Productions, and Sky Island Storytelling 

The special effects and creature design were done by Robert Bravo of Bravo FX.

Plot
The film opens with two police officers entering a bar that is filled with mutilated bodies. They find a young woman still alive. It cuts to the night before at the bar.

A varied crew of patrons hangs out casually at the bar, The Last Exit. After a disruption outside, bar owner Les goes out to check on the commotion.

A group of drug addicts burst in, holding the patrons and staff hostage as a strange cult gathers outside the bar and barricades both the front and back doors so that no one can leave.

The outside group warns everyone inside that there is a threat among them. As the night turns into day, the danger becomes apparent.

Cast
Felissa Rose...Les
Al Gomez...Hunter
Holly Rockwell...Gail
Kevin Caliber...Mac
Ashley Undercuffler...Frenzy
Xavier Roe...Will
Likun Jing...Lo
Rachel Amanda Bryant...Shiloh
Toya Morman...CeCe
Gregory Blair...Travis
Frankie Guzman...Rudy
Miranda Bourke...Rylee
Scott Alan Ward...Jared Scott
Greg Tally...Red
Zera Lynd...Lori
Robert C. Pullman...Gerry
Kelsie Mathews...Simone
Michael Turner Tucker...Carl 
Sage Mayer...Young Will

Production
The film raised over $63,000 on Indiegogo. The first version of the script was written in 2010 and the film went into production in 2022.

Release and Reception
The film was released on March 9, 2023, by Indie Rights. It received mostly positive reviews from critics and horror fans, who praised its special effects, creature design, look and cinematography, editing, and cast performances. Some reviewers also noted the film's playful depravity that added to its charm. While most reviews were positive, some reviewers were critical of the plot complexity and the number of characters.

References

External links
 

2023 films
2023 horror films
2020s English-language films
2020s American films